The 2010 CIS football season began on August 31, 2010, with the Windsor Lancers hosting the Ottawa Gee-Gees and the defending Vanier Cup champion Queen's Golden Gaels visiting the McMaster Marauders. The season concluded on November 27 at the PEPS stadium in Quebec City, Quebec with the Laval Rouge et Or winning the 46th Vanier Cup, a record tying sixth championship for the school. In this year, 25 university teams in Canada played CIS football, the highest level of amateur Canadian football.

Notable events
After their successful application into the NCAA Division II, the Simon Fraser Clan left the Canada West Universities Athletic Association to join the Great Northwest Athletic Conference, leaving Canada West with six teams.  The Clan, whose athletic programs were moved from the NAIA to CIS as a temporary refuge (up to that point, the Clan was to compete only against American universities), will continue to play football under Canadian (and CIS) rules when they play the UBC Thunderbirds in their annual cross-town rivalry matchup in October, but will otherwise play American football under the NCAA's rules.

The Waterloo Warriors have suspended its football operations this season, following a steroid investigation the previous season that had led to all 65 members of its team tested for steroids in March, with 3 positive results.  Charges against the three Warriors players testing positive for drug trafficking by the RCMP are still pending.  A further round of testing also saw players from the Windsor Lancers and the Acadia Axemen suspended for doping violations, though both universities will still field teams for the season.

Schedule

Montreal vs. Bishop's game on 2 October 2010 was postponed to the following day due to severe rain and flooding in the Lennoxville region.
Laurier forfeits win due to ineligible player.

Standings

Championships 
The Vanier Cup is played between the champions of the Mitchell Bowl and the Uteck Bowl, the national semi-final games. In 2010, according to the rotating schedule, the Dunsmore Cup Quebec championship team will meet the Ontario conference's Yates Cup champion for the Uteck Bowl. The winners of the Canada West conference Hardy Trophy will host the Atlantic conference Loney Bowl champions for the Mitchell Bowl.

Playoff bracket

Awards and Rankings

Top 10

Ranks in italics are teams not ranked in the top 10 poll but received votes.
NR = Not Ranked, received no votes.
Week 2 in CIS poll is Week 1 in Player of the Week poll.

Players of the Week

Post-Season Awards

All-Canadian Team 

 First Team 
Offence
 Brad Sinopoli, QB, Ottawa
 Rotrand Sené, RB, Montreal
 Adrian Charles, RB, Regina
 Simon Charbonneau-Campeau, WR, Sherbrooke
 Jade Etienne, WR, Saskatchewan
 Matthew Bolduc, IR, Ottawa
 Alexandre Poirier, IR, Sherbrooke
 Justin Glover, C, McMaster
 Matthew O'Donnell, OT, Queen's
 Patrick Neufeld, OT, Saskatchewan
 Matthew Norman, G, Western Ontario
 Ben Heenan, G, Saskatchewan
Defence
 Dan Schutte, DT, Saint Mary's
 Sébastien Tétreault, DT, Ottawa
 Arnaud Gascon-Nadon, DE, Laval
 David Ménard, DE, Montreal
 Henoc Muamba, LB, St. Francis Xavier
 Frédéric Plesius, LB, Laval
 Giancarlo Rapanaro, LB, Wilfrid Laurier
 Bryce McCall, FS, Saskatchewan
 Craig Butler, HB, Western Ontario
 Maxime Bérubé, HB, Laval
 Jamir Walker, CB, Regina
 Bradley Daye, CB, Mount Allison
Special Teams
 Christopher Milo, P, Laval
 Aaron Ifield, K, Calgary
 Raphaël Gagné, RET, Sherbrooke
 Second Team 
Offence
 Laurence Nixon, QB, Saskatchewan
 Nick FitzGibbon, RB, Guelph
 Jerimy Hipperson, RB, Western Ontario
 Cyril Adjeitey, WR, Ottawa
 Adam Molnar, WR, Mount Allison
 Liam Mahoney, IR, Concordia
 Brenden Owens, IR, Regina
 Nicholas Ternovatsky, C, Alberta
 Paul Swiston, OT, Calgary
 Anthony Barrette, OT, Concordia
 Simon Légaré, G, Montreal
 Mike Filer, G, Mount Allison
Defence
 Benjamin Thompson, DT, McGill
 Serge Kaminsky, DT, British Columbia
 Zander Robinson, DE, Western Ontario
 Adrian Saturley, DE, Acadia
 John Surla, LB, Western Ontario
 Filipe Fonseca Da Silva, LB, Sherbrooke
 Jeff Hecht, LB, Saint Mary's
 Julien Hamel, FS, Montreal
 Mark Holden, HB, Saint Mary's
 Harrison Maloney, HB, Bishop's
 Olivier Turcotte-Létourneau, CB, Laval
 Chayce Elliot, CB, Ottawa
Special Teams
 Darryl Wheeler, P, Western Ontario
 Matthew Falvo, K, Ottawa
 Jahmeek Taylor, RET, Saint Mary's

Teams

References

Cis Football Season, 2010
U Sports football seasons